Umrawat is a village in the Bhiwani district of the Indian state of Haryana. , the village had 510 households with a population of 2,781 of which 1,520 were male and 1,261 female.

References

Villages in Bhiwani district